Wayne McGinn (born February 14, 1959) is an American football coach.  He served as the head football coach at Western State Colorado University—now known as Western Colorado University—in 1996 and at Adams State College—now known as Adams State University—from 2000 to 2007, compiling a career college football coaching record of 41–57.

Coaching career
McGinn was the 19th head football coach at Adams State College—now known as Adams State University—in Alamosa, Colorado
and he held that position for eight seasons, from 2000 until 2007.  His coaching record at Adams State was 35–52.

Head coaching record

College

References

1959 births
Living people
Adams State Grizzlies football coaches
CSU Pueblo ThunderWolves football coaches
TCU Horned Frogs football coaches
Western Colorado Mountaineers football coaches
High school football coaches in Colorado